Don Juan is a 1974 Spanish comedy television special by Televisión Española, directed by Antonio Mercero, written by Juan Farias and Lola Salvador, with music by . It first aired on 1 June 1974 on Televisión Española's Primera Cadena. It won the Rose d'Or award and a Special Mention from the Press at the 1974 Montreaux Festival. It was also nominated for an International Emmy Award that same year.

Plot
A television director with little experience appears with his entire crew to face the casting for his version of José Zorrilla's Don Juan Tenorio. However, all kinds of mishaps happen throughout the process.

Cast
  as Don Juan
  as Doña Inés
  as Don Juan
 Carmen Maura as Doña Inés
 Antonio Medina as Don Juan
  as Doña Inés
 José Vidal as Don Juan
  as Director		
 Luis Ciges			
 Ketty de la Cámara			
 
 Emilio Mellado
 		
 Willy Rubio

Accolades

References

External links
 

1974 television specials
RTVE shows
Spanish short films